Steve Power (born in Liverpool) is an English record producer best known for his work with Robbie Williams. He has produced and mixed a wide variety of artists over the years, including Blur, Busted, Andrea Bocelli, Feeder, Joe Cocker, Diana Ross, Babybird, Babylon Zoo, Stephen Duffy, Black, The Bangles, Billy Ocean, Samantha Fox, James, Julian Cope, McFly, Ray LaMontagne and Kylie Minogue. Recently he has worked with artists as diverse as Beth Rowley, Stephen Duffy, Julian Velard, David Ford, Laura Critchley, Nerina Pallot, and Wonderland.

Biography 
Power got his start in the music industry as a member of Hambi and The Dance, signed to Virgin Records in 1981. With the advance from deal, Hambi built the Pink Recording Studios in Liverpool where they recorded their debut album. While the band was off touring, Power stayed to run to the studio as a commercial venture, and began recording bands from the Liverpool scene. Clients included Frankie Goes To Hollywood, Dead or Alive, Black, and A Flock of Seagulls.

Around 1983, Power was courted and signed by Producer manager Buzz Carter (Steve Lilywhite, Steve Brown), subsequently moving to London and working with Julian Cope and Level 42 among others.

The Battery years 
In 1986, Power was hired as a house engineer in the legendary Battery Studios owned by Clive Calder and Robert John "Mutt" Lange.  There he worked on a variety of projects, including Billy Ocean's Love Zone, A Flock Of Seagulls' The Story of a Young Heart,  The Icicle Works'  If You Want To Defeat Your Enemy, Sing His Song. Productions and mixes from this period include James' Strip-mine.

Work with Robbie Williams
In 1997, after a successful run in the charts including Babybird's "You're Gorgeous" and Babylon Zoo's "Spaceman", long standing friend and collaborator, writer/producer Guy Chambers approached Power to co-produce a solo album for ex-Take That member Robbie Williams. The first album, Life thru a Lens remained forty weeks inside the British top ten and 218 weeks altogether, making it the 58th best selling album in UK History with sales over  2.4 Million. Chambers and Power were jointly awarded 'Producer of the Year' by the International managers' Forum for the album. Power went on to produce the four following Williams albums, I've Been Expecting You, Sing When You're Winning, Swing When You're Winning, and Escapology, all selling over 2 million in the UK alone, each one listed in the Top 100 Best Selling UK albums, making Williams the best selling British solo artist in the history of the United Kingdom.

Recent work
Power has continued producing and mixing records. Recent work includes Beth Rowley's Little Dreamer,  Stephen Duffy's Runout Groove, and Julian Velard's The Planeteer, Nerina Pallot's The Graduate, Brazilian superstar Sandy Leah's Manuscrito, Hind Laroussi's Crosspop, and forthcoming albums by Julian Velard, British Sea Power, Bauer and Wonderland. Power also has writing and production credits for songs in the Kevin Sampson movie Powder due for release in spring 2011. In 2013 were released "Magma" by Selig a German Band from Hamburg (selig.eu)

References

External links

Living people
1964 births
English record producers
Musicians from Liverpool